Rampart Reservoir or Rampart Range Reservoir is a reservoir northwest of the city of Colorado Springs, Colorado in Pike National Forest. This water supplies the domestic drinking water for the city of Colorado Springs, and because of this, access to the area was briefly limited after the September 11 attacks on the United States. The area today is a recreation area for boaters, mountain bikers, and hikers.

The reservoir's construction began in the 1960s in response to the growing population of south-central Colorado and its increasing need for drinking water. The city of Colorado Springs voted in 1967 that the planned reservoir would eventually be opened for public recreation after the necessary facilities were built. The reservoir's dam, which is 3,400 feet (1,000 m) long and 230 feet (70 m) high, was built in 1969. 

Five years after its completion, the dam was completely filled and opened to the public as a recreation area. The reservoir has been stocked with fish by the Colorado Division of Wildlife, which continues to do so today.

Rampart Reservoir closed on June 23, 2012, due to the Waldo Canyon fire. The reservoir was reopened for limited access on Friday, May 24, 2013.

References

U.S. Forest Service. "Rampart Reservoir Recreation Area", Fs.fed.us. Accessed June 1, 2015.
S. McLeod - Resident in the lake area and lifetime fishermen Pike National Forest Access and Use Guide City of Colorado Springs Utilities US Forrest Service Guide to the Pikes Peak Region.

Reservoirs in Colorado
Protected areas of El Paso County, Colorado
Pike National Forest
Bodies of water of El Paso County, Colorado